Adachi may refer to:

People 
 Adachi (surname)
 Adachi clan, a family of samurai
 Adachi Ginkō, 19th-century Japanese artist 
 Tohru Adachi, a fictional character and one of the antagonists of Persona 4

Places 
 Adachi, Tokyo, a special ward of Tokyo, Japan
 Adachi District, Fukushima, Japan
 Adachi, Fukushima, a town in Adachi District, Fukushima Prefecture

See also 
 "Adachi-ga Hara", the title of the first issue in the 1970s Lion Books manga series as well as the fifth episode of the anime adaptation
 The noh play Kurozuka also known in kabuki as "Ōshū Adachigahara" (奥州安達原)